Martin Csirszki (born 7 January 1995 in Miskolc) is a Hungarian football player who currently plays for Putnok FC.

Club statistics

Updated to games played as of 18 November 2014.

Honours
Diósgyőr
Hungarian League Cup (1): 2013–14

References

DVTK website
HLSZ
Nemzetisport

1995 births
Living people
Sportspeople from Miskolc
Hungarian footballers
Association football midfielders
Diósgyőri VTK players
Nemzeti Bajnokság I players
Nemzeti Bajnokság II players